Mission Tejas State Park is a  state park located along Texas State Highway 21 in Houston County, Texas, originally constructed in 1935 and transferred to Texas Parks and Wildlife in 1957. The closest major town is Crockett, Texas. The park is open year-round.

Overview
Mission Tejas State Park contains several historic resources of East Texas and provides recreation for visitors. The park contains a commemorative representation of the first Spanish mission in Texas and one of the oldest surviving structures in Houston County. The park also contains a segment of the El Camino Real de los Tejas. The park provides 15 developed campsites and 2 primitive camping sites. A small pond allows visitors to fish. The park also contains approximately 4.5 miles of hiking trails.

History
The land for Mission Tejas State Park was purchased with contributions from the local community. Following the discovery of some Spanish artifacts in the area and an increased interest in finding the original location of Mission San Francisco de los Tejas, the local community sought to preserve this history. Believing this tract of land to have been the site of the original mission, the land was purchased and gifted to the State of Texas. Mission Tejas State Park was originally constructed from 1934 to 1935 by Company 888 of the Civilian Conservation Corps. The CCC constructed the park road, camping loop, a fire watch tower, and the original trails. The park was constructed to be a part of the Texas Forest Service. It remained within the Texas Forest Service until 1957 when it was transferred to Texas Parks and Wildlife and renamed Mission Tejas State Park.

Pre-European History
The area which now makes up the park is part of the historic settlement range of the Nabedache (or Tejas) Indians, part of the Caddo nation. The park lies just six miles from Caddo Mounds State Historic Site. The natives lived in villages stretched along San Pedro Creek and the Neches River. The park contains several known Caddo sites, but their location is not available to the public so that they may remain undisturbed.

Spanish Mission
Mission San Francisco de los Tejas was established May 23, 1690 by Captain Alonzo de Leon and Father Massanet of the Franciscan Order. The Spanish spent three days building a church and small living quarters among the Tejas villages along San Pedro Creek. Another mission, Mission Santissimo Nombre de Maria, was established along the Neches River the same year.

Mission San Francisco de los Tejas was abandoned on October 25, 1693. The actions of Spanish soldiers increased tensions among the Tejas. Crops also failed for two successive seasons. An epidemic then swept through the Tejas and killed many natives and one Spanish missionary. These events led to increased hostility and superstition among the Tejas. Fearing for their safety, the Spanish decided to leave the area. They buried the mission's bells and heavy items, set the mission on fire, and fled for San Antonio.  The missions in this area were not reestablished for several years. The exact location of San Francisco de los Tejas is still undetermined, but many have searched for it. Due to the fire, time, and natural deterioration, it is difficult to determine the exact location. However, the park contains a commemorative example of the mission.

Anglo Settlement
In the 1820s, Anglo Settlement of the area began in earnest. Within the park this is represented by the Rice Family Log Home. Originally constructed in 1828, the home was added onto twice. The final addition was completed in 1838. This home was built from local lumber and constructed by hand. The Rice family came to Texas with a land grant from the Spanish Government, honored by the Mexican government. The home contains original wallpaper and paint from the 1890s, and is still approximately 80% original. The home was lived in until approximately 1918 when it was turned into a storage building. It was donated to the state and moved to the park in 1974. The log home is a popular attraction for school groups and visitors interested in early Texas history. It is perhaps the oldest surviving structure in Houston County.

El Camino Real
The park contains an original segment of the El Camino Real de los Tejas. This historic route ran from Natchitoches, Louisiana to San Antonio. It was the predominant overland route across Texas for several centuries. The Rice Family Log Home within the park served as an inn along this route for travelers. Visitors to the park can still see the ruts created by carts along the path.

Civilian Conservation Corps
Company 888 of the Civilian Conservation Corps constructed this park from 1934-1935. The camp was located on a tract one mile from the park's current location. They constructed a dam and spillway, creating a small pond. They also constructed a fire watchtower, campsites, trails, and the park road. Lost until the 1980s, the park contains a natural spring-fed pool. Utilizing a natural spring and the slope of the land, the builders bricked up the spring, and may have created another rock feature downhill. Legend has it that the CCC used the feature for bathing but the proximity of their camp to the site makes this unlikely. CCC Company 888 built the commemorative example of the Mission San Francisco de los Tejas.

Natural Features
The park is located on the northern end of Davy Crockett National Forest within the Piney Woods of East Texas. The dominant tree species within the park is loblolly pine. Following massive clear cutting during the early 20th century, the CCC replanted much of the area, including the trees within the park. There are not many trees within the park more than eighty years old. The park contains abundant wildlife including squirrels, rabbits, foxes, and deer. Several species of bird are also present. Flora includes pine, oak, and other plants typical of the Piney Woods.

Recreational Opportunities
The park has several different recreational opportunities. Popular activities include hiking, nature viewing, geocaching, fishing and camping. The park has several different types of campsites, from water only tent sites to full hook up RV campsites. In total there are 15 developed sites, and 2 primitive sites. A variety of trails are available ranging from easily accessible to steep and narrow. Park staff also present educational and interpretive programs each week and also teach outdoor activities and skills. Each April, the park holds a Folk Festival including historical reenactment and demonstrations of pioneer skills and activities.

See also
 List of Texas state parks

References

External links

"Mission Tejas State Park," Texas Parks and Wildlife.

Protected areas of Houston County, Texas
State parks of Texas
Swimming venues in Texas
Civilian Conservation Corps in Texas